The Basílica de los Sacramentinos is a church in the Roman Catholic Archdiocese of Santiago de Chile. It administered by the Congregation of the Blessed Sacrament and its design was inspired by the Basilique du Sacré-Cœur in Paris.

References

Churches in Santiago, Chile
Roman Catholic churches in Chile
Basilica churches in Chile